The Stone is the New York Times philosophy series, edited by the Times opinion editor Peter Catapano and moderated by Simon Critchley. It was established in May 2010 as a regular feature of The New York Times Opinion section, with the goal of providing argument and commentary informed by or with a focus on philosophy. 
The series, as described on the Times website "features the writing of contemporary philosophers and other thinkers on issues both timely and timeless." More than a dozen of the essays in the series have been chosen as winners of  the American Philosophical Association's public op-ed contests. Works from the series have been collected into two volumes — "The Stone Reader: Modern Philosophy in 133 Arguments" and "Modern Ethics in 77 Arguments," both published by Liveright. 

Over the years, many essays published in the series have won the American Philosophical Association Public Philosophy Op-ed Prize, including four of the five winners in 2020. The New York Times announced in May of 2021 that the series would be ended, as part of a rebranding of the editorial page and a move away from labeled columns.

Contributors
Linda Martin Alcoff
Louise Antony
Paul Bloom
Paul Boghossian
Tyler Burge
Judith Butler
Noam Chomsky
Alice Crary
Arthur Danto
Jay L. Garfield
Gary Gutting
Carol Hay
John Kaag
Philip Kitcher
Rae Langton
Ernie Lepore
Peter Ludlow
Michael P. Lynch
Michael Marder
Jeff McMahan
Feisal G. Mohamed
Alva Noe
Martha Nussbaum
Steven Pinker
Peter Singer
Scott Soames
Jason Stanley
Bryan W. Van Norden
Cornel West
Edward O. Wilson
George Yancy
Santiago Zabala

References

External links
 
 

Philosophy blogs
The New York Times
2010 establishments in the United States